Rowan Trollope (born 1972) is an American business executive and technology entrepreneur. He is the former CEO of Five9, a publicly traded cloud software company whom Zoom announced their intent to acquire in July 2021 The deal was terminated by mutual agreement on September 30, 2021.

Career 
Trollope joined Five9 as CEO in May 2018. Since joining, Five9 has expanded its market cap to more than $10billion, .

In 2019, Trollope joined Neat.no as an advisor and early investor alongside Eric Yuan, founder and CEO of Zoom and OJ Winge.

Prior to Five9, Trollope was a senior vice president in Cisco's applications division. Products produced in Trollope's teams include collaboration software, telepresence hardware devices and cloud infrastructure, including WebEx Teams (formerly Cisco Spark), Cisco TelePresence, Cisco UC Manager, Cisco Unified Contact Center Enterprise and Cisco WebEx.

Prior to joining Cisco, Trollope was the group president of the SMB and the Symantec.cloud business unit where he led Symantec's sales, marketing and product development teams in the small and midsized business (SMB) segment as well as Symantec.cloud, the company's software-as-a-service (SaaS) business.

Trollope announced his resignation from Five9 on October 10, 2022, effective November 28, 2022, to take an opportunity as CEO Redis Inc., a privately held pre-IPO company outside the CCaaS space that Five9 plays in.

Personal life 
Trollope lives in the Russian Hill neighborhood of San Francisco with his wife and three children.

References

External links
Official site

1972 births
Living people
Businesspeople from San Francisco
Canadian businesspeople
Canadian emigrants to the United States
Cisco people
Gen Digital people